Psytron is a 1984 video game developed by Psy-Sci and published by Beyond Software.

Gameplay
Psytron is a game in which the player is the automated brain in charge of the defense and maintenance of a space station under attack.

Development
Psytron was programmed by Paul Voysey and Tayo Olowu.

Reception
Carol Hutchins reviewed Psytron for White Dwarf #56, giving it an overall rating of 9 out of 10, and stated that "I found it very exciting and thought that the addition of Freeze Time a very novel twist. I would strongly recommend it to anyone who finds playing wave after wave of identical, invincible opponents is tedious in the extreme."

Reviews
Crash (Jun, 1984)
Sinclair User - Aug, 1984
Your Spectrum #07 (1984-09)

References

External links
Text of additional reviews at Spectrum Computing

1984 video games
Alien invasions in video games
Commodore 64 games
Shoot 'em ups
Video games developed in the United Kingdom
ZX Spectrum games